Winona Senior High School is a publicly funded high school in Winona, in Winona County, which is located in southeastern Minnesota in the United States. The high school has a population of over 1200 students in grades 9–12. The school's mascot is Herky the Winhawk. The school is part of the Winona Area Public Schools (Independent School District #861).

Notable alumni
Alec Brown, basketball player, selected in 2014 NBA Draft by the Phoenix Suns
Elizabeth Esty, politician
Paul Giel, member of College Football Hall of Fame, Major League Baseball pitcher, and University of Minnesota athletic director
Garrett Heath, middle and long-distance runner
Elliott Heath, middle and long-distance runner
Jeremy Miller, businessman and politician
Fred Risser, member of the Wisconsin State Senate
Stephen S. Schwartz, judge
Tom Stoa, politician and beekeeper

References

External links
 

Educational institutions in the United States with year of establishment missing
Public high schools in Minnesota
Buildings and structures in Winona, Minnesota
Schools in Winona County, Minnesota